Wei Hongguang (born October 1961) is a former Chinese politician who spent his whole career in his home-province Guangdong. He was investigated by the Chinese Communist Party's anti-graft agency in January 2020. Previously he served as deputy secretary-general of Guangdong. He entered the workforce in July 1981, and joined the Chinese Communist Party (CCP) in March 1984.

Biography
Wei was born in Zhongshan, Guangdong, China in October 1961. In September 1978 he entered Guangdong Agricultural Machinery Technology School, where he graduated in July 1983. After graduation, he was assigned to Zhongshan Municipal Committee of the Communist Youth League, becoming its deputy secretary in March 1984 and secretary in June 1985. He was Communist Party Secretary of Tanzhou in March 1993, and held that office until August 1996. Then he was promoted to Secretary of Zhongshan Municipal Commission for Discipline Inspection and then 
Deputy Communist Party Secretary of Zhongshan. In February 2000 he was transferred to Zhuhai and appointed Deputy Communist Party Secretary and Secretary of the Municipal Commission for Discipline Inspection there. In February 2008 he became Deputy Communist Party Secretary of Yangjiang, rising to Communist Party Secretary in September 2012. In March 2016 he was transferred to Zhanjiang and appointed Communist Party Secretary and chairman of the Standing Committee of Zhanjiang Municipal People's Congress. He became Party Branch Secretary of Guangdong Provincial Development and Reform Commission in March 2017, and served until May 2018, when he was appointed deputy secretary-general of Guangdong. 

He is a delegate to the 19th National Congress of the Chinese Communist Party.

Investigation
On January 11, 2020, he was placed under investigation by the Central Commission for Discipline Inspection, the party's internal disciplinary body, and the National Supervisory Commission, the highest anti-corruption agency of the People's Republic of China, for "serious violations of regulations and laws".

On January 14, 2021, he was expelled from the CCP and dismissed from public office.

References

1961 births
Living people
People from Zhongshan
South China Normal University alumni
Central Party School of the Chinese Communist Party alumni
People's Republic of China politicians from Guangdong
Chinese Communist Party politicians from Guangdong